UFC 153: Silva vs. Bonnar was a mixed martial arts pay-per-view event held by the Ultimate Fighting Championship on October 13, 2012, at the HSBC Arena in Rio de Janeiro, Brazil.

Background 
Vitor Belfort was expected to face Alan Belcher at the event.  However, Belfort was pulled from the bout to face Light Heavyweight Champion Jon Jones on September 22, 2012 at UFC 152.  Belcher also was forced to drop out of the card due to a spinal fracture.

After having their first fight end in a no contest due to an eye poke in the first round, a rematch between Phil Davis and Wagner Prado was briefly linked to UFC on FX: Browne vs. Bigfoot and then scheduled for this event.

Quinton Jackson was scheduled to face Glover Teixeira at the event. However, Jackson pulled out of the bout citing an injury, and was replaced by Fabio Maldonado. Former UFC Light Heavyweight Champion Rashad Evans was offered the fight with Teixeira but turned it down due to the short notice.

Geronimo dos Santos was scheduled to fight Gabriel Gonzaga at this event. However, dos Santos pulled out of the bout after a blood test showed that he had antibodies for Hepatitis B. With no time to find a suitable replacement, Gonzaga was pulled from the card.

Erik Koch was expected to face UFC Featherweight Champion José Aldo in a title fight at this event, but on August 31, 2012, Koch was forced to pull out due to injury. Former UFC Lightweight Champion Frankie Edgar had agreed to step in for Koch and fight Aldo for the Featherweight title. However, on September 11, Aldo was also forced to pull out of the event with a foot injury after being involved in a motorcycle accident.

On September 12, 2012, UFC officials announced that UFC Middleweight Champion Anderson Silva and former The Ultimate Fighter star Stephan Bonnar would fight in the main event.  Silva was a massive favorite going into the bout, which was a three-round fight. Although all main event fights have been five-round affairs since UFC 138, UFC 153 was the exception due to the short notice.

On November 4, 2012, UFC announced Bonnar had tested positive for drostanolone, and Dave Herman for marijuana. Both fighters were suspended.

Results

Bonus awards
Fighters were awarded $70,000 bonuses.
Fight of the Night: Jon Fitch vs. Erick Silva
Knockout of the Night: Rony Jason
Submission of the Night: Antônio Rodrigo Nogueira

See also
List of UFC events
2012 in UFC

References

External links
Official UFC past events page
UFC events results at Sherdog.com

Ultimate Fighting Championship events
2012 in mixed martial arts
Mixed martial arts in Brazil
International sports competitions in Rio de Janeiro (city)
2012 in Brazilian sport